Rosario, officially the Municipality of Rosario, is a 5th class municipality in the province of Northern Samar, Philippines. According to the 2020 census, it has a population of 10,949 people.

It is bordered in the west by Lavezares and Victoria to the south. Its coastal area is protected as part of the Biri Larosa Protected Landscape and Seascape.

Geography

Barangays
Rosario is politically subdivided into 11 barangays.
Aguada
Buenavista
Jamoog
Ligaya
Poblacion (Estillero)
Salhag
San Lorenzo
Bantolinao
Commonwealth
Guindaulan
Kailingan

Climate

Demographics

Economy

References

External links
 [ Philippine Standard Geographic Code]
 Philippine Census Information
 Local Governance Performance Management System

Municipalities of Northern Samar